Alan Lane (or similar) is the name of:

Alan Lane, character in The Jury
Alan Lane (tennis), Australian tennis player
Allan Lane (1909–1973), actor
Allen Lane (1902–1970), British publisher
Allen Lane, a Canadian imprint of Penguin Random House International, named for the publisher
Allen Lane (SEPTA station)